Jim Stiger (January 7, 1941 – December 12, 1981) was an American football running back in the National Football League for the Dallas Cowboys and Los Angeles Rams. He played college football at the University of Washington.

Early years
Stiger attended Corcoran High School, before moving on to Bakersfield Junior College, where he helped his team reach the Little Rose Bowl. He transferred to the University of Washington after his sophomore season in 1961.

As a junior, he played as a fullback, registering 582 rushing yards, 4.5-yard average, 33 receiving yards and one receiving touchdown.

As a senior, he was switched to halfback behind Junior Coffey, posting as a backup 229 rushing yards, 4.8-yard average, 2 rushing touchdowns, 52 receiving yards and one receiving touchdown.

Professional career

Dallas Cowboys
Stiger was selected by the Dallas Cowboys in the 19th round (258th overall) of the 1963 NFL Draft. As a rookie, he was the starting fullback in 3 games, while leading the team in kickoff and punt returns, including a 45-yard punt return (at the time second longest in club history).

The next year, he started 8 games at both fullback and halfback. He served mainly as a backup to Amos Marsh, until being waived on November 3, 1965, to make room for Colin Ridgway, the first Australian to play in the National Football League.

Los Angeles Rams
On November 6, 1965, he was signed by the Los Angeles Rams to help improve the return game. In 1966, he was the fourth leading punt returner in the NFL. He was released on September 17, 1968, after arriving out of shape to training camp.

Personal life
On December 12, 1981, he died of a heart attack while playing racquetball.

References

1941 births
1981 deaths
People from Corcoran, California
Players of American football from California
American football running backs
Bakersfield Renegades football players
Washington Huskies football players
Dallas Cowboys players
Los Angeles Rams players
Sports deaths in California